U.D.R., also known as U.D.R. 666, was a Brazilian comedy rock band. Its style blended punk rock, funk carioca, gangsta rap and grindcore. The band was formed in Belo Horizonte, Brazil, in 2003.

The band consisted of three members, Professor Aquaplay, MS Barney and MC Carvão. The band used satire and black humor to sing about satanism, transsexualty, antichristianity, graphic violence, illegal drugs, bukkake, coprophagia, disabilities (like autism and paraplegia), hipster culture, homoeroticism and more.

Incorrectly labeled satanists, the humor created by the group created controversies and was responsible for many suits. They were prevented from singing some songs in their shows. They were popular enough to have some of their songs played on MTV Brasil and presented out of the country.

Justice and condemnation 

After over ten years, Professor Aquaplay and MC Carvão were condemned by the justice of the state of Minas Gerais because of the offensive lyrics. They were condemned to three years and five months in prison, which was later reduced to a fine of the equivalent of four times the monthly minimum wage in Brazil and communitary services.  These problems ended up in the end of the band in June 2016.

Etymology 

The band's name is an acronym derived from the "União Democrática Ruralista", an entity that brings together landowners  and whose stated objective is "the preservation of property rights and the maintenance of order and respect for the laws of the country". The band wanted a name that conveyed a conservative idea, opposing their 'politically incorrect' lyrics.

Members 
 Rafael Mordente (Professor Aquaplay) – (2003–2008, 2011–2016)
 João Carvalho (MS Barney) – (2003–2005, 2011–2016)
 Thiago Machado (MC Carvão) – (2003–2008, 2011–2016)

Discography

LPs 
 Seringas Compartilhadas Vol. 2 (Concertos para Fagote Solo, em Sí Bemol) (2003)
 Jamo Brazilian Voodoo Macumba Kung Fu... (2004)
 WARderley (2005)
 Bolinando Estraños (2008)

EPs 
 O Shape do Punk do Cão (2007)

Live albums 
 Racha de Chevetes (2011)

References 

Comedy rock musical groups
2003 establishments in Brazil
2016 disestablishments in Brazil
LGBT-related controversies in music
Obscenity controversies in music